Granstedt is a surname. Notable people with the surname include:

Anette Granstedt (born 1968), Swedish orienteering competitor
Daniel Granstedt (born 1975), Swedish guitarist
Greta Granstedt (1907–1987), American actress
Kerstin Granstedt, Swedish orienteering competitor
Pär Granstedt (born 1945), Swedish politician